Einar Schleef 	
(17 January 1944 – 21 July 2001) was a German dramatist, director, set designer, writer, painter, photographer, and actor.

Life 
Schleef was born and raised in Sangerhausen, a small town in the South East of Germany. An industrial landscape shaped by mining and surrounded by the mythical landscapes of Harz and Kyffhäuser. His father Wilhelm Schleef was an architect, his mother Gertrud Schleef worked as a seamstress. He had one sibling, Hans Schleef.

Career 
Einar Schleef started to train as a painter while he was still in school. He attended a socialist painting circle led by Wilhelm Schmied from 1958 onwards. In 1964 he started a degree in fine arts at the arts academy in Berlin Weißensee. After being expelled in 1965 Schleef switched to set design two years later and finished with a bachelor's degree in 1973.

From 1972–1975 he worked mainly for the Berliner Ensemble with its artistic director Ruth Berghaus. He co-directed three productions with B.K. Traglehn ("Katzgraben" in 1972, "Frühlings Erwachen" in 1974, "Fräulein Julie" in 1975). Even though artistically successful Schleef was put under more and more political pressure. In 1976 he left East Germany and via Vienna finally settled down in West Germany. From now on Schleef produced more and more text. Already from 1953 onwards he wrote journals and he continued this practice till his death. In the 1980s he wrote the critically acclaimed novel "Gertrud" portraying the life of his mother. He also wrote plays, radio plays and more fiction. From 1978 to 1982 he studied film making at the DFFB in West Berlin.

Schleef returned to theatre in 1985 when he became a steady director at Schauspiel Frankfurt. In the following 5 years he developed his theatre vision. He re-introduced the choir as a dramatis personæ and celebrated the tragic potential of the classic, ancient text. This theatre work was controversially received, audiences as well as critics varied between harsh criticism and very positive feedback.

Through the 1990s he continued to produce a number of successful and influential productions such as "Wessis in Weimar" by Rolf Hochhuth in 1993 at the Berliner Ensemble. "Puntila" by Bertolt Brecht in 1995 at the Berliner Ensemble. He directed as well as acted in "Puntila". Another production that needs to be mentioned is "Ein Sportstück" by Elfriede Jelinek in 1998 at Burgtheater Wien and his final piece as a director “Verratenes Volk” using texts by John Milton, Nietzsche, Dwinger and Alfred Döblin in 2000 at Deutsches Theater in Berlin.

The last phase of his theatre work was accompanied by the work on his epic theatre essay "Droge, Faust, Parsifal" published in 1997.

Schleef died in Berlin on 21 July 2001 due to a heart disease. He is buried in Sangerhausen.

Publications 

Harald Müller, Wolfgang Behrens: Kontaktbögen. Fotografie 1965–2001, Akademie der Künste Berlin, 2001 
Gabriele Gerecke, Harald Müller, Hans Ulrich Müller-Schwefe: Einar Schleef Arbeitsbuch, Berlin, 2002. 
Alexander Kluge: Einar Schleef – der Feuerkopf spricht. (Hg. Christian Schulte & Reinald Gußmann). Facts & Fakes, Band 5. Vorwerk 8, Berlin, 2003. 
Michael Freitag, Katja Schneider: Einar Schleef. Der Maler, Köln, 2008,

Awards and honors 
1995 Mülheimer Dramatikerpreis

References

External links 
 Einar Schleef
 ub.fu-berlin.de list of links edited by Universitätsbibliothek der Freien Universität Berlin
 Einar-Schleef-Arbeitskreis Sangerhausen
 Stiftung Moritzburg Schleef's paintings
 Schleef Vita written by Alexander Kluge, profile ITI Germany

1944 births
2001 deaths
German male dramatists and playwrights
20th-century German dramatists and playwrights
20th-century German male writers